The AMC straight-4 engine is a 2.5 L inline-four engine developed by American Motors Corporation (AMC) that was used in a variety of AMC, Jeep, and Dodge vehicles from 1984 to 2002. 

Note: Although the GM Iron Duke was a predecessor I4 engine in some AMC vehicles, it shares nothing in common with the AMC 2.5 L.

Development
American Motors devoted three years to the development of a new four-cylinder engine. The brand new engine was designed to use AMC's existing spacing between the cylinder bores so that the tooling remained the same. The location of other major components, such as the distributor, oil filter, and starter, were also kept the same so as to use the machine tools for the AMC straight-6 engine.

According to Jeep's chief engineer, Roy Lunn, "unlike most engines available today [it] was not designed for passenger cars and then adapted for trucks. We specifically developed it with our Jeep vehicles and Eagle in mind. That's the reason that performance and durability were of such prime consideration from the very beginning."

Although some of the components were interchangeable between the AMC  six-cylinder and the new engine, the four-cylinder was not a cut-down version of the big six. Noted Roy Lunn, "There are some common parts, but the 4-cylinder includes many unique items such as its own electronics systems. It also has a shorter stroke and larger bore. The valves are larger and the pistons are new." Roy Lunn recalled, "We wanted as much displacement - for power and torque - as possible within the confines of bore centers of the tooling. The only parameter we could influence substantially was stroke. So we picked the largest bore and stroke in order to get 2.5 Liters."

Design

The head features a combustion chamber and port design that was later used on the 4.0 L — the 2.5 L I-4 head lost two cylinders in its center, when compared to the design for the six-cylinder engines. The 2.5 engine also features five main bearings and eight overhead valves.

Instead of the standard AMC bell housing bolt pattern, AMC/Jeep engineers adopted the General Motors small V6 and four-cylinder bolt pattern (commonly used with GM's transverse-mounted powerplants) for their new engine, because the new AMC 2.5 replaced the four-cylinder engines that had been purchased from GM; and because AMC continued to buy the 2.8 L V6 from GM until the 4.0 L I6 was introduced in 1987. 

The four-cylinder and V6 shared the same drivetrain components, whereas stronger transmissions were needed for the new 4.0 L. The 2.5 L also shared an 18mm threaded oil filter used with the GM 2.8 L (ACDelco PF47 or equivalent) through 1986; when the 4.0 L was phased into production with the XJ models, the oil filter was changed over to a 20mm thread size shared with Renaults until 1991. 

The AMC I4 first appeared in 1984 model year with the new XJ Cherokee. In 1986 the head went under a minor revision, the head bolts were increased from 7/16 to 1/2 inch. From 1997 until 2002 it was marketed as the "Power-Tech I4". It was produced through 2002 for the Jeep Wrangler, as well as for the Dodge Dakota pickup that also featured the AMC/Jeep designed four-cylinder as its standard engine on regular cab rear-wheel drive models from 1996 through 2002.

This lightweight engine is similar to its "big brother" 4.0 L, and although not as powerful, it is durable with no reliability issues. The AMC 2.5 L is ranked among the very best of Jeep's I4 engines and is highly regarded for its robust build.

When emissions and fuel economy are a priority, the final MPFI versions of AMC's 2.5 L engine are the best. 

Note that the TBI system was made by Renix and used from mid-1986 through August 1990.

Applications
The AMC  engine was used in the following vehicles:
1983-1984 Jeep DJ-5M
1983–1984 AMC Eagle
1984–1986 Jeep CJ-7
1984–2000 Jeep Cherokee (XJ)
1986–1992 Jeep Comanche (MJ)
1987–2002 Jeep Wrangler (YJ/TJ)
1988–1989 Eagle Premier
1996–2002 Dodge Dakota

In China

AMC's Chinese joint venture Beijing Jeep Corporation also manufactured the 150 cubic-inch inline-four for installation in the locally built XJ Cherokee, originally called the Beijing Jeep BJ213 Cherokee. Local manufacture began in 1984 and the engine's name was C498QA in China. A wide variety of variants and code names were applied to the Cherokee over the years, with the most drastic change being the facelifted Beijing Jeep 2500 which arrived in 2002. Beijing Jeep also developed a stroked 2.7 L version called the C498QA3, which entered production around 2003. This fuel-injected engine displaces , produced  at 4800 rpm and was installed in a variant of the 2500 model called the Jeep 2700.

From the beginning of the Jeep joint venture, Beijing had envisioned installing the C498QA engine in the original Beijing Jeep, with trial installation taking place in 1986 (the BJ 212 E model). However, the first derivative of the old Beijing Jeep to be fitted with the American engine was the facelifted BJ 2020 V of 1999. Beijing's BJ 752 prototype sedan was also fitted with the Jeep Cherokee engine, but only three examples were built in 1987 and 1988. After the joint venture was dissolved in 2009, manufacture of the Cherokee continued under the Beijing Auto Works (BAW) name, although BAW only installed the C498QA engine in their Cherokee-based BJ2025 Leichi SUV from 2004 until 2008.

See also
AMC straight-6 engine
AMC V8 engine
AMC Engines
AMC/Jeep Transmissions
List of Chrysler engines

External links

References

AMC engines
Chrysler engines
Jeep engines
Straight-four engines
Gasoline engines by model